Mark Tuan (born Mark Yien Tuan, on September 4, 1993), known mononymously as Mark, is an American rapper, singer, songwriter and model. He is a member of the South Korean boy group Got7.

Biography 
Born as Mark Yien Tuan in Los Angeles, California, he spent a number of years in Paraguay and Brazil before eventually returning to California, where he grew up. He is Taiwanese, and has two older sisters and one younger brother. He took violin and piano lessons in elementary school, and moved to guitar in junior high school.

He attended Arcadia High School in Arcadia, California. In 2010, while with his friends at school, he caught the attention of a JYP Entertainment scout, who invited him to the auditions. Tuan had no desire to pursue a musical career but was encouraged by his friends and family who told him it was a good opportunity and thus, he gave it a try. He subsequently passed the audition and dropped out of school, which he attended until grade 10. He moved to South Korea in August 2010, where he learned acrobatics for one year, and martial arts for two years. Learning to sing, rap and dance, and performing on a stage as a trainee, inspired him to pursue the idol life and to become a singer.

Career

2012–2013: Pre-debut 
In 2012, Tuan made a cameo in the first episode of Dream High 2 as a backup dancer alongside JB and Jinyoung, who later became members of Got7 with him.

He appeared in the fourth episode of Mnet's 2013 reality-survival program WIN: Who is Next, which presented iKon and Winner members, who at the time were still trainees under YG Entertainment. It also featured future fellow Got7 member's Jackson Wang, BamBam and Yugyeom.

2014–2020: Debut and solo career 
On January 16, 2014, Tuan debuted as a part of K-pop boy group Got7, with the EP Got It?. Since his debut, Tuan has expressed his goals in working harder to become a singer-songwriter and making his own music. Tuan officially began writing rap and lyrics for Got7 songs since the Just Right EP, with the track "Back To Me". He contributed heavily to Flight Log: Turbulence, participating in the rap and lyric making in five out of thirteen songs, including "My Home" and "Let Me". With Got7's third studio album Present: You, Tuan released his first Korean solo song "OMW" featuring fellow member Jackson Wang; an accompanying music video was published on September 13, 2018. As of December 2021, Tuan is credited as songwriter on twenty songs and on eight as a co-composer.

On February 10, 2018, Tuan, along with fellow member BamBam, held the "Project Blur" fan meeting in Thailand at MCC Hall The Mall Ngamwongwan, whose tickets sold out in a minute.

Tuan has shown a keen interest in the fashion industry with launching his career as a model on magazines across South Korea, China and Thailand. Since early 2017, he has appeared on Dazed Korea, Ceci Korea, Grazia, Oh! Boy, Arena Homme+, 1st Look, Chicteen, Sudsapda, Stream, Yoho, Firebible, Jstyle, Beijing Youth Weekly, Nylon, Ele, Allure, Cosmo, The Star, Shinyouth, K-Media, Vogue Korea, GQ Thailand, Sweetdonut, Ginger, Starbox Young, Size, Vogue Thailand, Unnamedideal, Juz! Entertainment, Madame Figaro Mode, etc. Tuan became the cover of the 200th issue of the Korean charitable magazine The Big Issue, which provides support for the homeless, in March 2019. He has also released two limited edition apparel collections with Represent in 2018 and 2019 under XCIII referring to his birth year, helping in the creation and designing of each piece. The second collection, XCIII Evolution, sold 40,446 items, and all the profits proceeded to charity. After attending Milan Fashion Week 2019 for Ermenegildo Zegna with GQ Thailand and his collaboration with Represent, Tuan has expressed the desire to create his own brand. Tuan made his first US magazine cover in November 2020 for Lined's Changes issue.

In the spring of 2019, he joined Jus2 in their 'Focus' Premiere Showcase in Asia, acting as the MC for Macau (April 7), Taipei (April 14) and Singapore (May 4) stops.

Activities in China 
Tuan's increasing presence in the Chinese market began in 2018 with attending photoshoots, events and interviews. In January 2019, the variety show Change Your Life marked Tuan's first television appearance in mainland China. On April 11, 2019, Tuan attended the Weibo Starlight Awards in Hong Kong and won the Hot Star Award.

Tuan held his first ever set of fan meetings in China, titled "On Your Mark" from 2019 to 2020. On July 20, 2019, he held the first of his solo fan meeting in Nanjing, China which sold out all 3,000 seats. It was reported that the tickets for the event sold out within the first minute. The event also saw the signing of his first photobook, Mark Yixia, which had been earlier released on June 30. He then went on to a September 14 fan meeting in Chengdu, China the same year. As both the shows were well received by local fans, they were followed by an additional and final stop in Shanghai, China on January 11, 2020. On the day of the last fan meeting, he released his first Chinese single, "Outta My Head", officially debuting as a solo artist. His second single, titled "Never Told You" (从未对你说过), was released as a charity single on White Day. "Never Told You" was released in collaboration with the China Children's Charity Relief Foundation, and their partnership also saw the sale of a sweater in collaboration with ETET to help children in Heqing County in Yunnan Province.

Promoting in four countries (China, South Korea, Japan and Thailand), he has had many endorsement deals across China, and Vivo in Thailand alongside group member BamBam. This includes becoming the brand ambassador in China for Davines in April 2019 and Mentholatum on May 27, 2020 for Mentholatum Acnes, having previously endorsed Mentholatum's Lip Tiara in December 2019, which was restocked multiple times due to the high demand. In August 2020, Tuan became the brand ambassador for China Unicom, a large telecommunications operator in China.

From June 15 until August 28, 2020, Tuan appeared on eight episodes of Huya Super Idol League Season 10 as "Gamer Mark".

2021–present: Departure from JYP and music releases
In January 2021, Tuan, along with the other six members of Got7, chose not to renew his contract with JYP Entertainment. Following his departure, Tuan opened a YouTube channel which shortly gained over a million subscribers before he had posted any content to it.

The opening of Tuan's company Mark Tuan Studio in Beijing, China was announced on February 7 with focus on his solo Chinese activities and promotions. Meanwhile, he also set up a new label, DNA Records, together with his friends. On February 12, he released the single "One in a Million" in collaboration with Sanjoy Deb. An animated music video, which Tuan was also an executive producer of, was then released on his YouTube channel on Valentine's Day. He also served as the executive producer of Got7's "Encore" music video released on February 20.

A third apparel collection in collaboration with Represent, named XC3, went on sale on March 17. On April 29, Tuan signed with Creative Artists Agency. On June 2, he became the ambassador for Sisley's Black Rose Skin Infusion Cream. The same month, Tuan made the cover of L'Officiel Philippines alongside Winnie Harlow. On June 16, Tuan collaborated with Anessa for a limited edition Artist Box, becoming the first artist to do so.

In the second half of the year, he sang "Never Gonna Come Down" with Bibi for the movie Shang-Chi and the Legend of the Ten Rings. He attended Paris Fashion Week for Rick Owens, Raf Simons, Lanvin and Balenciaga in September.

On November 12, 2021, Tuan released the digital single "Last Breath". He subsequently released other songs in 2022, namely "My Life" on January 21, "Lonely" on March 24, and "Save Me" on April 7.

From May 27 to May 29, 2022, he held a sold-out solo fan meeting in Thailand titled "Pull-Up".

On July 1, 2022, Tuan released the digital single "IMYSM". The song was the fifth and last single extracted from his first studio album The Other Side, which was published on August 26, 2022 together with the music video of title track Far Away. The singer is credited both for songwriting and composition across every song of the 20-track record, showcasing both his singing and rapping abilities.

Personal life 
Growing up in the US and coming from a Taiwanese family, Tuan can speak both English and Mandarin Chinese, as well as having learned Korean and Japanese.

In December 2018, Tuan suffered from a leg injury while practicing martial arts tricks for the JYP Nation stage on 2018 KBS Song Festival and could not perform at the event or at later schedules including the fifth anniversary fan meeting for Got7, therefore he stayed seated for most of the concert.

Tuan provides support and donations through his work, such as charity donations through his clothing line collaborations and his second single, "Never Told You". In February 2020, he donated towards the purchase of ventilators for the COVID-19 pandemic in Hubei, China. On May 31, Tuan donated $7,000 to the George Floyd Memorial Fund and the Black Lives Matter movement in light of events in the US. In November, he donated $1,500 to the victims of Typhoon Ulysses. In April 2021, Tuan donated $30,000 to Stop AAPI Hate.

Discography

Studio albums

Singles

Writing credits 
All song credits, under Mark (10010921), are adapted from the Korea Music Copyright Association's database, unless otherwise noted.

Filmography

Dramas

Variety shows

Music videos

Awards and nominations

References

External links

1993 births
American expatriates in South Korea
American male pop singers
American people of Taiwanese descent
American expatriates in Brazil
American expatriates in Paraguay
Got7 members
JYP Entertainment artists
American K-pop singers
Korean-language singers of the United States
Living people
Singers from Los Angeles
People from Los Angeles